This list of bishops in France includes the names of the living Catholic bishops of the dioceses of France whether they are active or retired, French or not, . The names of the French Cardinals, including possibly those who are not bishops, appear in bold in the list. The mention emeritus indicates that the pope officially accepted the resignation of a bishop, usually after he has exceeded the age limit of seventy-five years imposed by canon law, sometimes for other reasons such as reasons health. He is no longer in office and his position as bishop of this diocese becomes honorary. Active Catholic bishops on this list are also members of the Bishops' Conference of France.

Metropolitan France

Overseas France

Oriental Churches in France

References

External links 

  website of the French Bishops' Conference: List of Bishops, Archbishops and Cardinals
  website of the French Bishops' Conference: Appointments
 catholic-hierarchy.org: France

 

Lists of living people
France religion-related lists